Brown Winery or Brown's Winery can refer to:

Brown Brothers Milawa Vineyard, an Australian wine company
Brown Estate, a United States winery